Julian Vasey (26 April 1950 – 27 May 1979) was a British alpine skier who competed in the 1968 Winter Olympics.

References

External links
 

1950 births
1979 deaths
British male alpine skiers
Olympic alpine skiers of Great Britain
Alpine skiers at the 1968 Winter Olympics